This article shows notable survey—either by critics or by the public of best Czech films. Some surveys focus on all Czech films, while others focus on a particular genre. It can be the highest ranked Czech exponent of an international poll.

Best film overall
This section shows results of Best Czech film polls.

Film critics
1994 Karlovy Vary International Film Festival survey

1998 poll of 55 Czech and Slovak film critics and publicists

Filmové dědictví 2007

Reflex Poll 2011

Sight & Sound Poll 2012

Kánon 100 - voting by 20 Czech film critics and historians in 2018

Public polls

Filmové dědictví 2007

Media Desk Poll 2010

Reflex Poll 2011

Kánon 100 Poll 2018

By genre

Comedy
1998 public survey "Comedy of the Century"

Public Survey by Novinky.cz 2007

Experimental
Kinobox rating 2017

Fairy tale films
Dáma rating 2012

Kinobox rating 2017

Horror
Kinobox rating 2017

Musical
Public Survey by Novinky.cz 2007

Science Fiction
Public Survey by Novinky.cz 2007

Kinobox Public Survey 2010

Kinobox rating 2017

Silent
2010 public survey by Týden.cz

By period

1918-1939
2010 public survey by Týden.cz

1940s
2010 public survey by Týden.cz

1950s 
2010 public survey by Týden.cz

1960s
2010 public survey by Týden.cz1960-1965

1965-1967

1968-1969

1970s
2010 public survey by Týden.cz

1980s
2010 public survey by Týden.cz

Since 1990
2011 survey by Hospodářské noviny

2007-2017 period by Kinobox rating 2017 (critics)

2008-2018 period by Kinobox rating 2018 (audience)

See also
Czech Lion Awards
List of Czech submissions for the Academy Award for Best Foreign Language Film
List of Czechoslovak submissions for the Academy Award for Best Foreign Language Film
List of films considered the best

References

Best
Best